Tomaiul Nou is a commune in Leova District, Moldova. It is composed of two villages, Sărățica Veche and Tomaiul Nou.

References

Communes of Leova District